{{Infobox settlement
| name                   = 
| image_skyline     = 
| image_caption          = (From top, left to right) downtown view from Tombol Hill, the busy intersection in downtown Rosario, Gualberto Avenue, the Risen Christ monument atop Tombol Hill.
| image_seal             = Rosario Batangas.png
| seal_size              = 100x80px
| image_map              = 
| map_caption            = 
| image_map1             = 
| pushpin_map            = Philippines
| pushpin_label_position = left
| pushpin_map_caption    = Location within the 
| coordinates            = 
| settlement_type        = 
| subdivision_type       = Country
| subdivision_name       = Philippines
| subdivision_type1      = Region
| subdivision_name1      = 
| subdivision_type2      = Province
| subdivision_name2      = 
| official_name          = 
| etymology              =  
| named_for              =  
| native_name            =
| other_name             =
| nickname               = {{plainlist|
 Rice Granary of Batangas, Agro-Industrial Capital of Southern Tagalog
  Home of Sinublian Festival}}
| motto                  =
| anthem                 =
| subdivision_type3      = District
| subdivision_name3      = 
| established_title      = Founded
| established_date       = June 9, 1687
| parts_type             = Barangays
| parts_style            = para
| p1                     =   (see Barangays)
| leader_title           =  
| leader_name            = Leovigildo K. Morpe
| leader_title1          = Vice Mayor
| leader_name1           = Atanacio G. Zara
| leader_title2          = Representative 
| leader_name2           = Lianda B. Bolilia
| leader_title3          = Municipal Council
| leader_name3           = 
| leader_title4          = Electorate
| leader_name4           =  voters
| government_type        = 
| government_footnotes   = 
| elevation_m            = 
| elevation_max_m        = 232
| elevation_min_m        = 100
| elevation_max_rank     =
| elevation_min_rank     =
| elevation_footnotes    = 
| elevation_max_footnotes= 
| elevation_min_footnotes= 
| area_rank              =
| area_footnotes         = 
| area_total_km2         = 
| population_footnotes   = 
| population_total       = 
| population_as_of       = 
| population_density_km2 = auto
| population_blank1_title= Households
| population_blank1      = 
| population_blank2_title= 
| population_blank2      = 
| population_demonym     =
| population_rank        =
| population_note        =
| timezone               = PST
| utc_offset             = +8
| postal_code_type       = ZIP code
| postal_code            = 
| postal2_code_type      = 
| postal2_code           = 
| area_code_type         = 
| area_code              = 
| website                = 
| demographics_type1     = Economy
| demographics1_title1   = 
| demographics1_info1    = 
| demographics1_title2   = Poverty incidence
| demographics1_info2    = %
| demographics1_title3   = Revenue
| demographics1_info3    =  
| demographics1_title4   = Revenue rank
| demographics1_info4    = 
| demographics1_title5   = Assets
| demographics1_info5    =  
| demographics1_title6   = Assets rank
| demographics1_info6    = 
| demographics1_title7   = IRA
| demographics1_info7    = 
| demographics1_title8   = IRA rank
| demographics1_info8    = 
| demographics1_title9   = Expenditure
| demographics1_info9    =  
| demographics1_title10  = Liabilities
| demographics1_info10   =  
| demographics_type2     = Service provider
| demographics2_title1   = Electricity
| demographics2_info1    = 
| demographics2_title2   = Water
| demographics2_info2    = 
| demographics2_title3   = Telecommunications
| demographics2_info3    = 
| demographics2_title4   = Cable TV
| demographics2_info4    =
| demographics2_title5   = 
| demographics2_info5    =
| demographics2_title6   = 
| demographics2_info6    =
| demographics2_title7   = 
| demographics2_info7    =
| demographics2_title8   = 
| demographics2_info8    =
| demographics2_title9   = 
| demographics2_info9    =
| demographics2_title10  = 
| demographics2_info10   =
| blank_name_sec1        = 
| blank_info_sec1        = 
| blank1_name_sec1       = Native languages
| blank1_info_sec1       = 
| blank2_name_sec1       = Crime index
| blank2_info_sec1       = 
| blank3_name_sec1       = 
| blank3_info_sec1       = 
| blank4_name_sec1       = 
| blank4_info_sec1       = 
| blank5_name_sec1       = 
| blank5_info_sec1       = 
| blank6_name_sec1       = 
| blank6_info_sec1       = 
| blank7_name_sec1       = 
| blank7_info_sec1       = 
| blank1_name_sec2       = Major religions
| blank1_info_sec2       = 
| blank2_name_sec2       = Feast date
| blank2_info_sec2       = 
| blank3_name_sec2       = Catholic diocese
| blank3_info_sec2       =
| blank4_name_sec2       = Patron saint
| blank4_info_sec2       = 
| blank5_name_sec2       = 
| blank5_info_sec2       = 
| blank6_name_sec2       = 
| blank6_info_sec2       = 
| blank7_name_sec2       = 
| blank7_info_sec2       =
| short_description      =
| footnotes              =
}}

Rosario, officially the Municipality of Rosario,  is a 1st class municipality in the province of Batangas, Philippines. According to the 2020 census, it has a population of 128,352 people.

Rosario is considered as among the interior municipalities of the Batangas Bay Region comprising eleven municipalities and two cities whose catchment areas drain into the Batangas Bay. The town is also dubbed as "The Rice Granary of Batangas".

 History 

Accounts show that the origin of Rosario was a Christian settlement along the coast of Lobo. The settlement became prey to the pirate raids during the Moro wars of the 18th century.

The Moro or pirate raids forced the inhabitants of the settlement to the safety of the ravine and forest on the north-west bank of Kansahayan River (now the Municipality of Taysan). Here the settlement was relocated. However, at the height of the Moro Wars in the second half of the 18th century, the vicious Moro raids reached Kansahayan. In one of their forays the Parish Priest is said to be among those slain.

The inhabitants decided to leave Kansahayan. They headed farther north holding a novena and praying the rosary in the process of their flight. On the 9th night of the novena, the fleeing inhabitants reached the river bank of Tubig ng Bayan (a river originating from Lipa) in now the town of Padre Garcia. Here they finally settled. Living in peace and prosperity, the grateful town's people erected a stone church south of the river bank in honor of their benefactress, the Lady of the Most Holy Rosary Parish. The town was named Santo Rosario.

Santo Rosario was razed to the ground during the Philippine–American War. In the early American military occupation of Santo Rosario, a cavalry officer, Captain Daniel H. Boughton, came upon the big spring at the foot of Tombol Hill. He decided to relocate the town west of the spring, where Rosario's population center is now.

Official records show that on June 9, 1902, a council of prominent citizens of the town met under a mango tree beside Tombol Spring. On the spot they formally organized the municipal government of Rosario. The following assumed the first key positions of the town government:

 Geronimo Carandang (Presidente)
 Diego Rosales (Bise Presidente)
 Luis Greñas (Secretario)
 Leon Magtibay (Tesorero)

A wealthy landowner, Don Antonino Luancing donated for the town's public buildings and plaza.

Local historians were not unanimous as the exact date of the founding of this town. Certainly it was among those organized by the ecclesiastical authorities after the creation of Batangas as a province in 1581. It is generally believed to have come to the existence in 1687 while still located along the coast of Lobo during the term of Don Nicolas Morales as gobernadorcillo. Originally, Rosario comprised the whole parts of the municipalities of Lobo, Taysan, Ibaan, San Juan de Bolbok and the entire municipality of Padre Garcia.

The old settlement in Kansayahan now bears the name of Pinagbayanan, a thriving marketing post in the municipality of Taysan. The old town site of Santo Rosario had been named Lumang Bayan before it was renamed Padre Garcia when the latter was created and carved out Rosario in 1949 as a separate municipality.

 Geography 

According to the Philippine Statistics Authority, the municipality has a land area of  constituting  of the  total area of Batangas.

 Climate 

 Barangays 
Rosario is politically subdivided into 48 barangays. Malaya was formerly known as Munting Tubig.

 Clusters 
For purposes of community organization and effective delivery of social development projects, the Office for Sustainable Development under supervision of the Office of the Municipal Mayor in 1995, divided the 48 barangays into 8 barangay clusters with 6 member barangays each.

This system was patterned after the resolutions traditionally passed by the Sangguniang Bayan as part of its organizational plan following the general elections when new members are elected into office for a new term.

Consequently, the barangay cluster arrangement was adopted and served as the framework for land use development strategies enunciated under the  Comprehensive Land Use Plan of Rosario, Batangas for Planning Period 2000–2010 (CLUP)''.

Demographics 

In the 2020 census, Rosario had a population of 128,352.

Economy

Education 
The Leon Manigbas Elementary School (LMES) is a government primary school located in San Jose, Rosario, Batangas, Philippines. The "school code" is 107578. As of 2020, the principal is Ella Castillo, and the school colors are Blue and Yellow.

Leon Manigbas Elementary School was established in 1993 and has existed for 27 years as of 2020.

Government

Elected officials 
The current set of municipal officials were elected during the 2022 General Elections; their term is set to expire in 2025.

Tourism 
Attractions include:
 Tombol Hill and The Grotto
 Naambon Falls
 Batangas Racing Circuit in Barangay Maligaya

Notable personalities 
 Jovit Baldivino, Pilipinas Got Talent (season 1) winner
 Jose Romulo, Premiere actor born Romulo Alib Zuño in Rosario and was a former police officer of the town
 Jovencito Zuño, Chief State Prosecutor

Gallery

Sister cities 
 Iloilo City

References

External links 

[ Philippine Standard Geographic Code]

Municipalities of Batangas